Kubang Pasu, officially known as the Kingdom of Kubang Pasu Darul Qiyam (Jawi: کراجاءن کوبڠ ڤاسو دار القيام;) was a historical Malay Kingdom located in the northern Malay Peninsula. The state was established in 1839 as an honour for Tunku Anum, a member of Kedahan nobility after his efforts of restoring the diplomatic ties between Kedah and Siam during the Perang Musuh Bisik (The War of Whispering Enemies) of 1821. The kingdom witnessed the reign of two monarchs before it was reunified with Kedah in 1864.

History

Origin
The Fall of Kedah under the Siamese hands had bought the kingdom on its knees by 1821. The devastation caused by the advancing Siamese powers had caused the Sultan of Kedah, Ahmad Tajuddin Halim Shah II to retreat to Prince of Wales Island and lived in exile in Malacca. From Malacca, he launched several failed rebellions to recapture over his previous kingdom in 1828 to 1831 and between 1838 and 1839.

It was during this time that Tunku Anum raised to prominence in the Kedahan political arena. He is a member of the political elite in the Royal House of Kedah and the son of Tunku Abdul Rahman, the ruler of Chenak district. He was previously appointed as a kingdom's representation for the Bunga Mas tribute to Siam in August 1809, in which he was awarded the honorific title of Tengku Paduka Raja Jambangan.

During the Siamese occupation of Kedah, he managed to gain influence by strengthening his relationship with Phya Sina Nunchit, the Siamese administrator of Kedah and the son of the Ligor governor. His political ambitions were largely manoeuvred by his desire to release the Kingdom from the Siamese imperialism on the Kedahan soil.

Liberation of Kedah
While slowly receiving the confidence of the Siamese administrator, Tunku Anum also began to recruit local Malay militia in Gua Kerbau, Bukit Keplu, located in present-day Kodiang. The regiment was trained with the aim to combat the Siamese colonial powers. While leaving his forces behind in Gua Kerbau, he went to the Ligor court with a recommendation letter. He managed to gain further respect and trust of the Ligor governor during his diplomatic visit in the territory.

During his mission in Ligor, the Malay militia began to launch an offensive against the Siamese troops in Alor Ganu, near Anak Bukit. Desperate, Nunchit sent a letter to his father, the Governor of Ligor to request aid to qualm the rebellion. While the ruler of Ligor mobilise its troops down south, he also offered Tunku Anum as his representative in Kedah, hoping that his expertise in the domestic governance and politics can subjugate the rebellion.

Tunku Anum politely refused the position as the Ligor representative in Kedah. Believing that if he accepted the offer, Kedah shall be forever remained under the Siamese occupation and he will be reduced as a mere puppet monarch. As the battle escalated in Kedah, the Siamese again requested military assistance from Ligor. Only this time, due to the soaring cost of war, the huge number of deaths and the spreading of deadly diseases in the military camp, the Siamese decided to withdraw their military presence in Kedah, with a requirement that Kedah shall send Bunga Mas and Bunga Perak procession to Siam every 3 years. Thus, liberating the state against the Siamese occupation.

The King of Kubang Pasu
Tunku Anum also led the restoration of the monarchy system in Kedah following the end of Siamese occupation in the kingdom. Upon the return of Sultan Ahmad Tajuddin after his exile in Malacca, he awarded Tunku Anum with 24 districts from Tunjang to Sendawa, with Pulau Pisang in Jitra as its capital, for his instrumental role in liberating Kedah. He ascended the throne in 1839 and bestowed the honorific title of Darul Qiyam "the sovereign state" to the kingdom.

Kubang Pasu was met with an unprecedented growth during his rule with the construction of various development projects in the area, including a judicial court, fortified defence system, prison, religious schools and land office. The area then prospered as a centre for trade and rice production. He also ordered the construction of local factory which paved ways for the textile industry in the area now known as Pulau Kain and improved the irrigation system of the local river, presently called as Sungai Tunku Anum (Tunku Anum River). The land titles and grants transaction made during this era also bore the seal of Kubang Pasu.

Reunification with Kedah
Tunku Anum ruled the kingdom for 17 years before his death on 29 May 1853 in Istana Kota Pulau Pisang, the palatial residence of Kubang Pasu. His demise was widely believed to be caused by the devastation upon the earlier death of his son in 1848. He was laid to rest in Kubang Pasu Royal Cemetery, Pekan Tunjang. A narration of his life was written nearby his tomb.

On 31 May 1853, Tunku Ishak, was proclaimed as the King of Kubang Pasu, while Tunku Muhammad Saman was appointed as the Raja Muda (crown prince) of the kingdom, both princes are the grandsons of Tunku Anum. In contrast to Tunku Anum, Tunku Ishak was known to be a rather unpopular monarch with his subjects and other ministers due to various bitter policy that he promulgated. Following various resistant movement by the populace during his 10-year reign, the king was forced to abdicate his position as a monarch and reunifying the area into Kedah on 10 November 1864, effectively marking the end of the Kubang Pasu Kingdom.

Rulers

Gallery

See also
 Kingdom of Setul Mambang Segara, another historical Malay Kingdom born during the Partition of Kedah.
 List of Sunni Muslim dynasties

References

Bibliography

 
 
 
 
 
 
 
 

Former countries in Malaysian history
Former countries in Thai history
Former sultanates
Malay Peninsula
Peninsular Malaysia
Southern Thailand
Muslim dynasties
Malay folklore
States and territories established in 1810
States and territories disestablished in 1902
1839 establishments in Asia
1864 disestablishments in Asia
19th-century establishments in Southeast Asia